The 1978 Trans-Am Series was the thirteenth running of the Sports Car Club of America's premier series. It was the first time the series left North America (i.e. the United States and Canada), with a round in Mexico at the end of the season. All races except for the Six Hours of Watkins Glen ran for approximately one hundred miles.

Results

‡ The Watkins Glen 6 Hours was a round of the World Championship for Makes, the overall winner was an FIA Group 5 Porsche 935

Championships

Driver

Category I
Bob Tullius – 189 points
Babe Headley – 98.5 points
Frank Joyce – 72 points
Brian Fuerstenau – 45 points
John Huber – 44.5 points

Category II
Greg Pickett – 132.5 points
Tuck Thomas – 114.5 points
Ludwig Heimrath – 102 points
Hal Shaw, Jr. – 73 points
Monte Sheldon – 71 points

Manufacturer

Category I (Over 2.5L)
Jaguar – 73 points
Chevrolet – 69 points
Datsun – 3 points

Category II (Over 2.5L)
Chevrolet – 74 points
Porsche – 65 points
Pontiac – 10 points

Combined (Under 2.5L)
Porsche – 72 points
Datsun – 19 points
British Leyland – 18 points
Mazda – 18 points
Opel – 12 points

References

Trans-Am Series
Trans-Am